East Williston is the name of several places in the United States of America:

East Williston, Florida 
East Williston, New York